Styphelia coelophylla is a plant in the family Ericaceae native to Western Australia.<ref name=WA>{{FloraBase|id=6430|name=Styphelia coelophylla}}</ref> It was first described as Leucopogon coelophyllus in 1839 by Allan Cunningham, but based on the phylogenetic studies of  Darren Crayn, Michael Hislop and Caroline Puente-Lelièvre in 2020 it was moved to the genus, Styphelia, and Styphelia coelophylla'' is the name accepted by the WA herbarium.

Distribution 
It is found in the IBRA regions of : Avon Wheatbelt,  Esperance Plains, Coolgardie, and Mallee.

References

External links
Styphelia coelophylla occurrence data from the Australasian Virtual Herbarium

coelophylla

Plants described in 1839
Ericales of Australia
Flora of Western Australia